Willie Mae Thornton (December 11, 1926 – July 25, 1984), better known as Big Mama Thornton, was an American singer and songwriter of the blues and R&B. She was the first to record Leiber and Stoller's "Hound Dog", in 1952, which was written for her and became her biggest hit, staying seven weeks at number one on the Billboard R&B chart in 1953. According to Maureen Mahon, a music professor at New York University, "the song is seen as an important beginning of rock-and-roll, especially in its use of the guitar as the key instrument".  

Thornton's other recordings include the original version of "Ball and Chain", which she wrote.

Early life
Thornton's birth certificate states that she was born in Ariton, Alabama, but in an interview with Chris Strachwitz, she claimed Montgomery, Alabama, as her birthplace, probably because Montgomery was better known than Ariton.

She was introduced to music in a Baptist church, where her father was a minister and her mother a singer. Thornton and her six siblings began to sing at early ages. Her mother died young, and Willie Mae left school and got a job washing and cleaning spittoons in a local tavern. In 1940 she left home and, with the help of Diamond Teeth Mary, joined Sammy Green's Hot Harlem Revue and was soon billed as the "New Bessie Smith". Her musical education started in the church but continued through her observation of the rhythm-and-blues singers Bessie Smith and Memphis Minnie, whom she deeply admired.

Career

Early career
Thornton's career began to take off when she moved to Houston in 1948. "A new kind of popular blues was coming out of the clubs in Texas and Los Angeles, full of brass horns, jumpy rhythms, and wisecracking lyrics."
In 1951 she signed a recording contract with Peacock Records and performed at the Apollo Theater in 1952. Also in 1952, while working with another Peacock artist Johnny Otis, she recorded "Hound Dog", the first record produced by its writers Jerry Leiber and Mike Stoller. The pair were present at the recording, with Leiber demonstrating the song in the vocal style they had envisioned; "We wanted her to growl it," Stoller said, which she did. Otis played drums, after the original drummer was unable to play an adequate part. The record sold more than half a million copies, and went to number one on the R&B chart, helping to bring in the dawn of rock 'n' roll. Although the record made Thornton a star, she reportedly saw little of the profits.

On Christmas Day 1954 in a theatre in Houston, Texas, she witnessed fellow performer Johnny Ace, also signed to Duke and Peacock record labels, accidentally shoot and kill himself while playing with a .32 pistol. Thornton continued to record for Peacock until 1957 and performed in R&B package tours with Junior Parker and Esther Phillips.

Thornton's success with "Hound Dog" was followed over three years later by Elvis Presley recording his hit version of the song. His recording at first annoyed Leiber who wrote, "I have no idea what that rabbit business is all about. The song is not about a dog, it's about a man, a freeloading gigolo." But Elvis' version sold ten million copies, so today few fans know that "Hound Dog" began as "an anthem of black female power."  Similarly, Thornton originally recorded her song "Ball 'n' Chain" for Bay-Tone Records in the early 1960s, "and though the label chose not to release the song... they did hold on to the copyright" – which meant that Thornton missed out on the publishing royalties when Janis Joplin recorded the song later in the decade. However, in a 1972 interview, Thornton acknowledged giving Joplin permission to record the song and receiving royalty payments from its sales.

Success 
As her career began to fade in the late 1950s and early 1960s, she left Houston and relocated to the San Francisco Bay area, "playing clubs in San Francisco and L.A. and recording for a succession of labels", notably the Berkeley-based Arhoolie Records. In 1965, she toured with the American Folk Blues Festival in Europe, where her success was notable "because very few female blues singers at that time had ever enjoyed success across the Atlantic." While in London on October 20, she recorded her first album for Arhoolie, Big Mama Thornton – In Europe. It featured backing by blues veterans Buddy Guy (guitar), Fred Below (drums), Eddie Boyd (keyboards), Jimmy Lee Robinson (bass), and Walter "Shakey" Horton (harmonica), except for two songs (and a third as a bonus track on the 2005 CD reissue) on which Fred McDowell provided acoustic slide guitar.

In 1966, Thornton recorded her second album for Arhoolie, Big Mama Thornton with the Muddy Waters Blues Band – 1966, with Muddy Waters (guitar), Sammy Lawhorn (guitar), James Cotton (harmonica), Otis Spann (piano), Luther Johnson (bass guitar), and Francis Clay (drums). She performed at the Monterey Jazz Festival in 1966 and 1968. Her last album for Arhoolie, Ball n' Chain, was released in 1968. It was made up of tracks from her two previous albums, plus her composition "Ball and Chain" and the standard "Wade in the Water". A small combo, including her frequent guitarist Edward "Bee" Houston, provided backup for the two songs. Janis Joplin and Big Brother and the Holding Company's performance of "Ball 'n' Chain" at the Monterey Pop Festival in 1967 and the release of the song on their number one album Cheap Thrills renewed interest in Thornton's career.

By 1969, Thornton had signed with Mercury Records, which released her most successful album, Stronger Than Dirt, which reached number 198 in the Billboard Top 200 record chart. Next, Thornton signed a contract with Pentagram Records and finally fulfilled one of her biggest dreams. A blues woman and the daughter of a preacher, Thornton loved the blues and what she called the "good singing" of gospel artists like the Dixie Hummingbirds and Mahalia Jackson. She had always wanted to record a gospel record, and did so with the album Saved (PE 10005). The album includes the gospel classics "Oh, Happy Day", "Down By The Riverside", "Glory, Glory Hallelujah", "He's Got the Whole World in His Hands", "Lord Save Me", "Swing Low, Sweet Chariot", "One More River", and "Go Down Moses".

By then, the American blues revival had come to an end. While the original blues acts like Thornton mostly played smaller venues, younger people played their versions of blues in massive arenas for big money. Since the blues had seeped into other genres of music, the blues musician no longer needed impoverishment or geography for substantiation; the style was enough. While at home the offers became fewer and smaller, things changed for good in 1972, when Thornton was asked to rejoin the American Folk Blues Festival tour. She thought of Europe as a good place for herself, and, with the lack of engagements in the United States, she agreed happily. The tour, beginning on March 2, took Thornton to Germany, France, Switzerland, Austria, Italy, the Netherlands, Denmark, Norway, Finland, and Sweden, where it ended on March 27 in Stockholm. With her on the bill were Eddie Boyd, Big Joe Williams, Robert Pete Williams, T- Bone Walker, Paul Lenart, Hartley Severns, Edward Taylor and Vinton Johnson. As in 1965, they garnered recognition and respect from other musicians who wanted to see them.

Late career and death 
In the 1970s, years of heavy drinking began to damage Thornton's health. She was in a serious auto accident but recovered to perform at the 1973 Newport Jazz Festival with Muddy Waters, B.B. King, and Eddie "Cleanhead" Vinson (a recording of this performance, The Blues—A Real Summit Meeting, was released by Buddha Records). Thornton's last albums were Jail and Sassy Mama for Vanguard Records in 1975. Other songs from the recording session were released in 2000 on Big Mama Swings. Jail captured her performances during mid-1970s concerts at two prisons in the northwestern United States.

She was backed by a blues ensemble that featured sustained jams by George "Harmonica" Smith and included the guitarists Doug MacLeod, Bee Houston and Steve Wachsman, the drummer Todd Nelson, the saxophonist Bill Potter, the bassist Bruce Sieverson, and the pianist J. D. Nicholson. She toured extensively through the United States and Canada, played at the Juneteenth Blues Fest in Houston and shared the bill with John Lee Hooker.

She performed at the San Francisco Blues Festival in 1979 and the Newport Jazz Festival in 1980. Big Mama also performed in the "Blues Is a Woman" concert that year, alongside classic blues legend Sippie Wallace, sporting a man's three-piece suit, straw hat, and gold watch. She sat at center stage and played pieces she wanted to play, which were not on the program. Thornton took part in the Tribal Stomp at Monterey Fairgrounds, the Third Annual Sacramento Blues Festival, and the Los Angeles Bicentennial Blues with BB King and Muddy Waters. She was a guest on an ABC-TV special hosted by actor Hal Holbrook and was joined by Aretha Franklin and toured through the club scene. She was also part of the award-winning PBS television special Three Generations of the blues with Sippie Wallace and Jeannie Cheatham.

Thornton was found dead at age 57 by medical personnel in a Los Angeles boarding house on July 25, 1984. She died of heart and liver disorders due to her longstanding alcohol abuse.

Style
Thornton's performances were characterized by her deep, powerful voice and strong sense of self. She was given her nickname, "Big Mama," by Frank Schiffman, the manager of Harlem's Apollo Theater, because of her strong voice, size, and personality. Thornton stated that she was louder than any microphone and did not want a microphone to ever be as loud as she was. Alice Echols, the author of a biography of Janis Joplin, said that Thornton could sing in a "pretty voice" but did not want to. Thornton said, "My singing comes from my experience... My own experience. I never had no one teach me nothin’. I never went to school for music or nothin’. I taught myself to sing and to blow harmonica and even to play drums by watchin' other people! I can't read music, but I know what I'm singing! I don't sing like nobody but myself."

Her style was heavily influenced by gospel music that she listened to growing up in the home of a preacher, though her genre could be described as blues. Thornton was quoted in a 1980 article in The New York Times: "when I was comin' up, listening to Bessie Smith and all, they sung from their heart and soul and expressed themselves. That's why when I do a song by Jimmy Reed or somebody, I have my own way of singing it. Because I don't want to be Jimmy Reed, I want to be me. I like to put myself into whatever I'm doin' so I can feel it".

Scholars such as Maureen Mahon have praised Thornton for subverting traditional roles of African-American women. She added a female voice to a field that was dominated by white males, and her strong personality transgressed stereotypes of what an African-American woman should be. This transgression was an integral part of her performance and stage persona.

Scholar Tyina Steptoe has written that Thornton's gender nonconformity helped to establish rock 'n' roll as a rebellious form of music. She says that Thornton should be understood as queer.

Legacy
During her career, Thornton was nominated for the Blues Music Awards six times. In 1984, she was inducted into the Blues Hall of Fame.

In addition to "Ball 'n' Chain" and "They Call Me Big Mama," Thornton wrote twenty blues songs. Her "Ball 'n' Chain" is included in the Rock and Roll Hall of Fame list of the "500 Songs That Shaped Rock and Roll". It was not until Janis Joplin covered Thornton's "Ball 'n' Chain" that it became a hit.  Though Thornton did not receive financial compensation for her song, Joplin arranged for Thornton to open shows for her. Joplin found her singing voice through Thornton, who praised Joplin's version of "Ball 'n' Chain", saying, "That girl feels like I do."

Thornton subsequently received greater recognition for her popular songs, but she is still underappreciated for her influence on the blues, rock & roll and soul music. Thornton's music was also influential in shaping American popular music. The lack of appreciation she received for "Hound Dog" and "Ball 'n' Chain" as they became popular hits is representative of the lack of recognition she received during her career as a whole. Many critics argue that Thornton's lack of recognition in the music industry is a reflection of an era of racial segregation in the United States, both physically and in the music industry. Scholars suggest that Thornton's lack of access to broader audiences (both white and black), may have been a barrier to her commercial success as both a vocalist and a composer.

In 2004, the nonprofit Willie Mae Rock Camp for Girls, named for Thornton, was founded to offer a musical education to girls from ages eight to eighteen. The first full-length biography of Thornton, Big Mama Thornton: The Life and Music, by Michael Spörke, was published in 2014.

In 2022, Big Mama Thornton was featured as a character in a biopic about Elvis Presley, simply titled Elvis. In the movie, Thornton (played by Shonka Dukureh) is depicted in much the same way she was in real life. Namely, as the original singer of "Hound Dog" and Thornton is shown prominently in the movie singing the song. Presley (played by Austin Butler) hears Thornton sing "Hound Dog" at a concert and decides to make a cover of the song. Dukureh's performance of "Hound Dog" was included in full on the soundtrack. Both the movie and soundtrack were critical and commercial hits and gave greater public attention to Thornton.

Discography
This is a partial discography.

Studio and live albums

Compilations

Source: , except where indicated

See also

 List of blues musicians

References

Bibliography
 Spörke, Michael (2014). Big Mama Thornton: The Life and Music. Jefferson, North Carolina: McFarland. .

External links

1926 births
1984 deaths
20th-century African-American women singers
20th-century American drummers
20th-century American singers
20th-century American women singers
Ace Records (United Kingdom) artists
Alcohol-related deaths in California
American blues drummers
American blues harmonica players
American blues singers
American rhythm and blues singers
American women drummers
Arhoolie Records artists
Burials at Inglewood Park Cemetery
Mercury Records artists
Musicians from Montgomery, Alabama
People from Dale County, Alabama
Texas blues musicians
Vanguard Records artists
West Coast blues musicians